The 2013 Aegon Championships (also known traditionally as the Queen's Club Championships) was a men's tennis tournament played on outdoor grass courts. It was the 111th edition of those championships and was part of the ATP World Tour 250 series of the 2013 ATP World Tour. It took place at the Queen's Club in London, United Kingdom, in the club's 127th year between 10 and 16 June.

Singles main draw entrants

Seeds

 Rankings are as of May 27, 2013.

Other entrants
The following players received wildcards into the singles main draw:
  Edward Corrie
  Alexandr Dolgopolov
  Dan Evans
  Kyle Edmund
  James Ward

The following players received entry from the qualifying draw:
  Jamie Baker
  Ilija Bozoljac
  Samuel Groth
  Feliciano López

The following players received entry as lucky losers:
  Rohan Bopanna
  Frederik Nielsen

Withdrawals
Before the tournament
  Kevin Anderson (shoulder injury)
  Brian Baker
  Simone Bolelli
  Rogério Dutra da Silva
  Mardy Fish
  Robin Haase
  Lukáš Lacko
  Lu Yen-hsun
  Gilles Müller
  Dmitry Tursunov

During the tournament
  Michaël Llodra (harmstring injury)

Doubles main draw entrants

Seeds

 Rankings are as of May 27, 2013.

Other entrants
The following pairs received wildcards into the doubles main draw:
  Lleyton Hewitt /  Bernard Tomic
  Jamie Murray /  John Peers
The following pairs received entry as alternates:
  Thiemo de Bakker /  Igor Sijsling
  Guillermo García-López /  John-Patrick Smith
  Paul-Henri Mathieu /  Marinko Matosevic

Withdrawals
Before the tournament
  Kevin Anderson (shoulder injury)
  Michaël Llodra (hamstring injury)
  Bernard Tomic (hamstring injury)
During the tournament
  Nicolas Mahut

Finals

Singles

 Andy Murray defeated  Marin Čilić, 5–7, 7–5, 6–3

Doubles

 Bob Bryan /  Mike Bryan defeated  Alexander Peya /  Bruno Soares, 4–6, 7–5, [10–3]

Rally against cancer
Following the finals on the last day, Andy Murray took part in a charity event called "Rally against Cancer" alongside former British no. 1 Tim Henman, in which they faced off against Murray's coach, former world no. 1 and 8-time Grand Slam champion Ivan Lendl, and world number 6 Tomas Berdych. The event was organised in order to raise money for the Royal Marsden Cancer Charity, after British Davis Cup player Ross Hutchins was diagnosed with Hodgkins Lymphoma at the end of 2012. Following the one set affair, in which the Brits emerged victorious, Murray and Henman then teamed up with a number of British celebrities, including comedians Jimmy Carr, Michael McIntyre and Jonathan Ross, actor Eddie Redmayne, businessman Sir Richard Branson and mayor of London Boris Johnson. The initial target for the event was £100,000, however this was exceeded by over £50,000 during the event. Furthermore, Murray donated his entire prize money pot of around £73,000 towards the charity.

References

External links
 Official website 

 
Queen's Club Championships
Aegon Championships
Aegon Championships
Aegon Championships
Aegon Championships